The West Virginia Open is a golf tournament that is administered by the West Virginia Golf Association. It has been played annually since 1933 except in 1959. Golf legend Sam Snead won the event 17 times, including a 22-stroke, 54-hole victory in 1957 over Mike Krak.

Winners

(a) - denotes amateur

External links
West Virginia Golf Association official site
List of winners
Year-by-year history

Golf in West Virginia
State Open golf tournaments